Namotu Island is one of the few hundreds of islands that make up the country of Fiji. It is in the southernmost part of the chain of islands called the Mamanuca Islands, which are just west of Nadi. Namotu is located just off the western coast of the main island of Fiji known as Viti Levu. Namotu Island Resort, a haven for tourists, lies about five nautical miles west of Viti Levu. It is owned by Google co-founder Larry Page.

History
In July 1840 the Wilkes Expedition named this island after Richard Russell Waldron, purser, USS Vincennes.

References

Sources
Brown, W. G. (1993). Diving and Snorkeling Guide to Fiji. Houston, Tex.: Pisces Books.
Surfline/Wavetrak, Inc.  (n.d.)  About Wilkes Pass, Namotu.  Surfline. Retrieved (4/20/13)  http://www.surfline.com/surf-report/wilkes-pass-namotu-fiji_7285/travel/
Subsurface Fiji. (2012)  Game Fishing.  Subsurface Fiji.  Retrieved (4/20/13)  https://web.archive.org/web/20130826191715/http://fijidiving.com/?cat=14
Waterways Surf Adventures.  (n.d.)  Activities – Surfing.  Namotu Island Fiji.  Retrieved (4/20/13)  https://web.archive.org/web/20131118210705/http://www.namotuislandfiji.com/surfing-with-map

Islands of Fiji
Mamanuca Islands